Hasa may refer to:

 Hasa (Korean military), a rank in the Korean military
 Hasa, Al Madinah, Saudi Arabia
 Hearing and Speech Agency of Baltimore
 Hasa of Eshtemoa (3rd–4th century CE), Jewish scholar
 Hasa oasis, a historical region now in Saudi Arabia
 Has-a, a relationship between objects in object-oriented programming
 Hasa, Jordan, a village in Jordan
 Wadi al-Hasa, also called Wadi Hasa, a wadi in Jordan

See also
 
 Al-Hasa (disambiguation)